The year 610 BC was a year of the pre-Julian Roman calendar. In the Roman Empire, it was known as year 144 Ab urbe condita . The denomination 610 BC for this year has been used since the early medieval period, when the Anno Domini calendar era became the prevalent method in Europe for naming years.

Events
 Naucratis, a city in Egypt, is founded, eventually becoming one of the more prominent cities of that nation.
 Necho II succeeds Psamtik I as king of Egypt.

Births
 Anaximander, Greek philosopher and scientist (approximate date) (d. c. 546 BC)

Deaths
 Psamtik I, king of Egypt

References